The Indiana State Fair Band Day is a marching band competition held at the Indiana State Fair in Indianapolis every August. The contest serves as the championship for the Central Indiana Track Show Association, an organization that governs marching band contests in Indiana during the Summer. First held in 1947 it is one of, if not, the oldest high school marching band contests in the United States. The 74th Indiana State Fair Band Day competition was held on 6 August 2021. The 2020 contest was canceled due to the COVID-19 pandemic.

Contest format

Between 40 and 50 bands participate every year. They are separated into three classes Class AAA, Class AA, and Class A, based on band size. The preliminary competition takes place in the morning and the top 16 bands regardless of class compete in the finals competition at night. Each band is allowed 4–6 minutes to perform 2 minutes for entry and one minute to exit.

Records

Prize money

References

 Indiana State Fair 2017

Marching band competitions
Indiana State Fair